Peter Grayson Washington (August 31, 1798 – February 10, 1872) was an American official who served as U.S. Assistant Secretary of the Treasury

Early life
Washington was born in 1798 in Virginia. He was a son of Susan Monroe ( Grayson) Washington (1770–1822) and Lund Washington (1767–1853), the postmaster of Washington, D.C.  After his mother's death in 1822, his father married Sarah Johnson, a daughter of Capt. John Johnson.

His father was named for his uncle, Lund Washington, who was the neighbor and distant cousin of President George Washington. His paternal grandparents were Robert Washington and Alice ( Strother) Washington. His maternal grandparents were Mary Elizabeth ( Wagener) Grayson and the Rev. Spence Monroe Grayson, brother of U.S. Senator William Grayson (through their mother, they were cousins of James Monroe).

Career
Washington began his career as a clerk in the United States Treasury. He was later promoted to Chief Clerk of the Treasurer's Office, Chief Clerk of Sixth Auditor; First Assistant Postmaster General, and Assistant Secretary of the Treasury under Secretary James Guthrie and Howell Cobb under Presidents Franklin Pierce and James Buchanan. He was a vice president of the Oldest Inhabitants' Association of New York City and was a member of the Washington National Monument Association.

Personal life
In 1822, Washington was married to Margaret MacPherson (1786–1874), a daughter of Gen. William MacPherson and Margaret Stout MacPherson. Margaret's younger brother, Joseph Stout MacPherson, was married to Peter's younger sister, Mary Elizabeth Washington. Together, they were the parents of:

 Virginia Grayson Washington (1824–1869), who died unmarried.
 Julia Maria Washington (1827–1914), who married Dr. Caleb W. Hornor in 1859.
 William McPherson Washington (1828–1849), who died unmarried.

Washington died in New York City on February 10, 1872. His funeral was held in Washington at the Church of the Epiphany and conducted by the Rev. Dr. Starkey.

References

External links
Washington, Peter G. (Peter Grayson), 1798-1872 at SNAC
Stephen Russell Mallory to Colonel Peter Grayson Washington, 1854 January 10

1798 births
1872 deaths
Peter Grayson
United States Assistant Secretaries of the Treasury